Heshi (also Romanized as Heshī; also known as Hishain, Hishi, Ishein, and Khishi) is a village in Khvoresh Rostam-e Shomali Rural District, Khvoresh Rostam District, Khalkhal County, Ardabil Province, Iran. At the 2006 census, its population was 146, in 41 families.

References 

Tageo

Towns and villages in Khalkhal County